The Fortunate Pilgrim is a 1988 American-Italian television drama miniseries written and directed by Stuart Cooper. It is based on the Mario Puzo's novel with the same name.

Plot

Cast

Sophia Loren as Lucia
Edward James Olmos as  Frank Corbo
John Turturro as  Larry
Anna Strasberg as  Filomena 
Yorgo Voyagis as  Tony
Mirjana Karanović as  Clara
Annabella Sciorra as  Octavia
 Ron Marquette as  Vinnie
Hal Holbrook as  Dr. Andrew McKay
 Harold Pruett as  Gino
Ljiljana Blagojević as  Rosa
 Dianne Daniels as  Harriett
Pepe Serna as  John Colucci 
 Helen Stirling as Aunt Louchi 
Roxann Dawson as  Louisa 
Bernard Kay as  Pugnale 
Frano Lasić as  Dr. Laschen
Stuart Milligan as  Lefty Fay 
Shane Rimmer as  Reilly

References

External links
 

1980s American television miniseries
Italian television miniseries
Films directed by Stuart Cooper
1980s Italian television series